227th Brigade may refer to:
227th Infantry Brigade (United Kingdom)
227th Mixed Brigade (Spain)